The Oireachtas Cup was an annual hurling competition organised by the Gaelic Athletic Association between 1939 and 1999 for the top inter-county teams in Ireland.

The series of games were usually played in the autumn months after the completion of the All-Ireland Senior Hurling Championship.  The prize for the winning team was the Oireachtas Cup and a special set of gold medals for the winning team.  The tournament was initially a one-off challenge game between two top teams, however, as more teams entered a straight knock-out tournament developed.

The Oireachtas Cup was a post-championship hurling competition, with large crowds at Croke Park on the day of the final. Over time, however, it fell out of favour with both players and supporters and was eventually scrapped.

The title was won at least once by eleven different counties, eight of which have won the title more than once.  The all-time joint record-holders are Galway and Tipperary, who won the competition eleven times.

General statistics

Performance by county

List of Oireachtas Finals

References

All-Ireland inter-county hurling championships
Defunct hurling competitions
1939 establishments in Ireland